The 1961–62 British Ice Hockey season had no organised league structure for the second consecutive year.

University Match
The University Varsity match took place between Oxford University and Cambridge University on 2 March at the Richmond Ice Rink. Cambridge won 11-1.

References 

British